The La Palma giant lizard (Gallotia auaritae) is a giant lacertid historically living on the island of La Palma (Canary Islands, Spain); its habitat ranged from sea level up to altitudes of 800 m.

It probably lives in xerophytic vegetation and is presumably an egg-laying species.

Generally considered extinct in historic times, there were sightings (including photographic evidence) of a large lacertid in 2007 which may possibly correspond to this species, although these sightings have been assessed as doubtful.

Taxonomy

Working on fossil and subfossil evidence, this giant lizard was originally described as a subspecies of the El Hierro giant lizard (Mateo et al. 2001). Later, it was elevated to full species rank (Afonso & Mateo 2003). Specimen remains from La Palma assigned to G. goliath seem to belong to this taxon instead; if this is correct, they indicate that the average size of this species had been decreasing over the last millennia, possibly due to humans preferring to hunt larger lizards (Barahona et al. 2000). The recently sighted La Palma giant lizard individual was slightly more than 30 cm (~1 ft) long and had an estimated age of four years. New expeditions to the area of the rediscovery are planned in the hope of finding more individuals and possibly a breeding population.

However, scientists have not had the chance of studying any living specimen and the present fossil and subfossil material of G. auaritae does not allow for sufficiently detailed analyses of its phylogenetic status. Probably it belongs to the simonyi clade like the other giant Gallotia species from the western islands, but whether it actually was as close to G. simonyi as presumed remains unverified (Brown, 2008). The reason for this is also that it was only discovered after the present species' description that G. goliath was not another local representative of G. simonyi, as was previously assumed, but a more distantly related species (Maca-Meyer 2003).

Status

Its decline may have started 2000 years ago with the arrival of humans on La Palma. Until its recent sightings, it was believed to have become extinct in the last 500 years. The main causes of this presumed extinction were believed to have been introduced cats, consumption by the original human population of the Canary Islands, and habitat destruction for agriculture. It is not the only lizard from the Canary Islands to have been considered extinct only to be rediscovered later: This happened with other giant lizards of the Canary Islands, like the El Hierro giant lizard and La Gomera giant lizard (rediscovered 1974 and 1999, respectively); the somewhat smaller Tenerife speckled lizard was only discovered for the first time in 1996.

At this point, not a single living individual has been captured and any remaining population, if existing, is assumed to be tiny.

See also
 List of extinct animals of Europe

References

 Afonso, O.M. & Mateo, J.A. (2003): Los lagartos gigantes canarios: conservación creativa de poblaciones mínimas. In: Jiménez, I. & Delibes, M. (eds): Al Borde de la Extinción: Integrando Ciencia, Política y Sociedad en la Recuperación de Especies Amenazadas. Evren, Valencia PDF abstract
 Barahona, F.; Evans, S. E.; Mateo, J.A.; García-Márquez, M. & López-Jurado, L.F. (2000): Endemism, gigantism and extinction in island lizards: the genus Gallotia on the Canary Islands. J. Zool. 250(3): 373-388.  (HTML abstract)
 Brown,R.P. (2008); Evidence of another giant lizard from the Canary Islands. Oryx 42:171-172.
 Maca-Meyer, N.; Carranza, S.; Rando, J.C.; Arnold, E.N. & Cabrera, V.M. (2003): Status and relationships of the extinct giant Canary Island lizard Gallotia goliath (Reptilia: Lacertidae), assessed using ancient mtDNA from its mummified remains. Biol. J. Linn. Soc. 80(4): 659–670.  (HTML abstract)
 Mateo, J.A.; García-Márquez, M.; López-Jurado, L.F. & Barahona, F. (2001): Descripción del lagarto gigante de La Palma (Islas Canarias) a partir de restos subfósiles. Revista Española de Herpetología 15: 53-59. [Spanish with English abstract] PDF abstract

External links
 The Extinction Website
 "Found in La Palma a species thought to be extinct" (in spanish)

Gallotia
Giant Lizard
Reptiles of the Canary Islands
Reptiles described in 2001